Market Street Bridge, also known as the Second Street Bridge, is a vehicular bridge over the Passaic River crossing the Passaic-Bergen county line in Passaic and Wallington in northeastern New Jersey. The double-leaf bascule bridge was built in 1930 and fixed in the closed position in 1977. It was reconstructed in 2002. It carries a two-lane street and sidewalks in a late-19th and early-20th century industrial area along the river. An earlier structure built at the crossing in 1894 was damaged during the Passaic floods of 1902 and 1903 but survived.

It is one of three bridges crossing the river between the two municipalities, the others being the Gregory Avenue Bridge and the Eighth Street Bridge. Two other crossings of the Passaic have been known as Market Street Bridge, the since-removed Pennsylvania Railroad bridge at Newark Penn Station and the extant vehicular bridge at Paterson.

See also
 Market Street Bridge (disambiguation)
 List of crossings of the Lower Passaic River
 List of crossings of the Hackensack River
 List of NJT moveable bridges
 List of fixed crossings of the North River (Hudson River)

References

Bridges over the Passaic River
Bascule bridges in the United States
Bridges completed in 1930
Road bridges in New Jersey
Wallington, New Jersey
Buildings and structures in Passaic, New Jersey
Bridges in Bergen County, New Jersey
Bridges in Passaic County, New Jersey
Steel bridges in the United States
1930 establishments in New Jersey